This is a list of Belgian football transfers for the 2017 summer transfer window. Only transfers involving a team from the professional divisions are listed, including the 16 teams in the Belgian First Division A and the 8 teams playing in the Belgian First Division B.

The summer transfer window will open on 1 July 2017, although some transfers were announced prior to that date. Players without a club may join one at any time, either during or in between transfer windows. The transfer window ends on 1 September 2017, although a few completed transfers could still be announced a few days later.

Sorted by date

January 2017

February 2017

March 2017

April 2017

May 2017

End of 2016–17 season
After the end of the 2016–17 season, several players will return from loan to another club or will not have their contracts extended. These will be listed here when the date is otherwise not specified.

June 2017

July 2017

August 2017

September 2017

Sorted by team

Belgian First Division A teams

Anderlecht

In:

Out:

Antwerp

In:

Out:

Charleroi

In:

Out:

Club Brugge

In:

Out:

Eupen

In:

Out:

Excel Mouscron

In:

Out:

Genk

In:

Out:

Gent

In:

Out:

Kortrijk

In:

Out:

Lokeren

In:

Out:

Mechelen

In:

Out:

Oostende

In:

Out:

Sint-Truiden

In:

Out:

Standard Liège

In:

Out:

Waasland-Beveren

In:

Out:

Zulte Waregem

In:

Out:

Belgian First Division B teams

Beerschot Wilrijk

In:

Out:

Cercle Brugge

In:

Out:

Lierse

In:

Out:

OH Leuven

In:

Out:

Roeselare

In:

Out:

Tubize

In:

Out:

Union SG

In:

Out:

Westerlo

In:

 

Out:

Footnotes

References

Belgian
Transfers Summer
2017 Summer